The Rotten Fruit is an adult animated mini-series created by Noah Belson and Eli Roth.  The show was about a rock and roll band consisting of violent, sociopathic pieces of fruit.  The tagline was "They drink. They shag. They rock. They're fruit."  Roth, the co-creator of the series went on to a successful career in film directing with such films as Cabin Fever and Hostel.

References

External links

The Rotten Fruit's official website

American adult animated comedy television series